Kanas Lake (Xiao'erjing: كَانَاسِ خٗ; Mongolian: Ханас нуур; , USY: Қанас Көли) is a lake in Altay Prefecture, Xinjiang, China. The lake is located in a valley in the Altai Mountains, near the very northern tip of Xinjiang and the autonomous region's borders with Russia, Kazakhstan and Mongolia. The lake was formed around 200,000 years ago during the Quaternary period as a result of glacier movement. The crescent moon shaped lake has an estimated water storage capacity of 53.8 billion cubic meters, coupled with an average depth of around 120 meters.

The Kanas River, flowing out of the lake, later merges with the Hemu River to form the Burqin River, which itself discharges into the Irtysh River at Burqin Town, the county seat of Burqin County.

There is a large population of ethnic Tuvans and Kazakhs in the Kanas valley. While most of these people have maintained their traditional agricultural and nomadic life styles, many work in the developing tourism industry and have established facilities for orienteering, hiking, rafting, rock climbing, paragliding and camping. The scenic spot is classified as a AAAAA scenic area by the China National Tourism Administration.

About 117 different kinds of birds live along the lake.

Giant fish 

For several centuries there have been sightings of large lake creatures in the waters. First efforts in research of these legends were done by Yuan Guoying of Xinjiang University, who observed fish of enormous size in 1985. He and his students assessed that the fish could be 10 – 15 m long and weigh more than 4 tons, with total population in excess of 50 individuals.

Frequency of observation has increased in the 21st century, with the development of mass tourism. A video was taken and shown in the local Chinese media where numerous unidentifiable creatures can be seen. 
According to CCTV10, the creatures living in the lake are speculated by Chinese scholars to be giant Hucho taimen.

Gallery

See also 
 Ake Kule Lake
 Tourism in China

References

External links 

CCTV News: Unknown Creatures Videotaped by An Amateur in Lake Kanas

Lakes of Xinjiang
AAAAA-rated tourist attractions
World Heritage Tentative List
Nature reserves in China
LKanas